National Academic Quiz Tournaments, LLC is a question-writing and quiz bowl tournament-organizing company founded by former players in 1996. It is unique among U.S. quiz organizations for supplying questions and hosting championships at the middle school, high school, and college levels. NAQT operates out of Shawnee, Kansas and Minneapolis–Saint Paul.

The company mostly writes practice questions and questions for high school and middle school invitational tournaments, as well as for some game shows. Its involvement in college quiz bowl is mostly restricted to sectional tournaments and the Intercollegiate Championship Tournament.

At the college level

The ICT is divided into divisions, unlike ACF Nationals, so that a clear undergraduate champion is determined (all formats allow graduate students to compete in some form).

Collegiate divisions

Division I Overall
NAQT's eligibility rules state that any student taking at least three credit hours towards a degree at a university may compete on that university's team, and indeed may not compete independently if such a team exists. If no program exists at their university's campus, they may compete on the team for another campus of the same university, with the provision that they must leave that team should their home campus organize a program.

If any member of the team has an undergraduate degree, the team competes in the Division I competition, and is only eligible for the open championship (i.e. the overall championship).

Division I Undergraduate
At Sectional Championship Tournaments (SCTs) and the Intercollegiate Championship Tournament (ICT), teams that do not meet the Division II requirements play together. However, awards are given, including bids to the ICT, for the top undergraduate team. A team is eligible for the undergraduate championship if all members of the team are undergraduate students, and none of them have played in four years of NAQT collegiate competition prior to the current year. The undergraduate championship was first awarded in 1998.

Division II
Also introduced in 1998, Division II is intended to give first- and second-year students an opportunity to compete against other players and teams of the same level of experience. The rules of Division II eligibility are that one must be eligible for DI Undergraduate (i.e. no degree, and less than four years of experience), and in no year prior qualified for or participated in ICT.

Exceptions to the eligibility rules have been granted to deal with special circumstances in past years; however, as they are controversial when they occur, they do not occur often.

Community colleges
Two-year colleges usually compete in separate SCTs each February (it is permitted, but rare, for teams from these schools to compete in DI). Eight teams qualify for the Division II ICT, where they compete alongside other DII teams in a manner analogous to that of DI Undergraduate teams. However, students at two-year colleges are exempt from the DII eligibility restrictions. In fact, they have three years of eligibility at the DII level.

Winners of NAQT Intercollegiate Championship Tournament 

Notes

At the high school level
Teams qualify to the High School National Championship Tournament through a variety of methods.  Most commonly, a team qualifies by finishing in the top 15% of the field at a tournament that uses NAQT questions. If a school wants to send more than one team to nationals, the school must qualify all said teams at the same time during a single tournament.

The small school award is given to a public school with a non-selective admissions policy and less than 500 students in grades 10 through 12. Up until and including 2013, the small school champion was decided on a playoff between top finishing teams at the High School National Championship Tournament. Since 2014, a separate national championship tournament has been held for small schools.

Winners of NAQT High School National Championship Tournament 
The winners of the NAQT High School National Championship Tournament:

At the middle school level
For the 2010–2011 academic year, NAQT has introduced a program for middle school. A corresponding middle school national championship, called the MSNCT, was held in 2011 in Chicago.

Winners of NAQT Middle School National Championship Tournament 

Notes

Jeopardy!
Various NAQT employees and former NAQT players have appeared on the game show Jeopardy! Over 30 NAQT players or employees have participated on the show, including 17 who qualified for the Ultimate Tournament of Champions, including two finalists, Brad Rutter and Ken Jennings. Jennings writes questions and edits the literature and mythology categories for NAQT. Due to the success of these players, adults trying out must now declare any affiliation to NAQT or quizbowl on their information sheet. (See Jeopardy! audition process for further discussion.)

In 2006, competitors in the High School National Championship Tournament were given the opportunity to audition for the Jeopardy! Teen Tournament and the Jeopardy! College Championship.  Ben Schenkel of Moravian Academy (Allentown, Pennsylvania) qualified for the Teen Tournament at this tryout, and finished as the tournament's first runner-up. Meryl Federman of Livingston High School (Livingston, New Jersey) qualified for the second edition of the teen tournament, called the Jeopardy! Teen Tournament Summer Games, and won.

See also
Quiz bowl
PACE
Academic Competition Federation
National History Bee and Bowl
College Bowl
Rules

References

External links
NAQT 
Media guide with FAQs
Quiz Bowl packet archive
Quiz Bowl Forums
Interactive Quiz Bowl question database

Student quiz competitions
1996 establishments in the United States
Companies based in Kansas
Educational publishing companies